Power Play is the sixth studio album recorded by Australian-New Zealand group Dragon, released in September 1979. It was the group's first album without their iconic singer Marc Hunter although arguably it was the lack of support from the group's label, rather than a decline in quality of the group's output, that accounted for its poor commercial performance: Power Play peaked at number 64 on the Australian Kent Music Report. It was the group's final studio album for five years; they split up in December 1979. Unlike other Dragon albums from the 1970s, it has not been reissued on CD, except as a bootleg; notwithstanding that Dragon in its current form has been playing for over a decade with Mark Williams as singer, Power Play appears to be regarded as 'non-canon' amongst the group's records. 

The cover of the album refers to fourth album Running Free, the new line-up of the group depicted on the front cover; the back cover reveals they hold weapons behind their backs.

Track listing 
 Motor City Connection (Jenny Hunter-Brown, Todd Hunter) – 3:50
 Counting Sheep (Billy Rogers, Paul Hewson) – 3:41
 Crying Shame (J. Hunter-Brown, T. Hunter) – 3:12
 Bus Stop (Robert Taylor) – 3:16                                                                                                                                                                                                                
 Time Of The Year (Billy Rogers, Paul Hewson) – 4:09
 Gans En Farben (B. Rogers, Kerry Jacobson, Richard Lee, Robert Taylor, T. Hunter, P. Hewson) – 3:09
 Crooked Highway (P. Hewson) – 4:31
 For Free (R. Taylor) – 4:19
 3:33 (J. Hunter-Brown, T. Hunter) – 3:00
 Same Old Lies (B. Rogers, R. Taylor) – 3:52

Charts

Personnel 
 Bass, vocals – Todd Hunter
 Drums  – Kerry Jacobson
 Guitar, vocals – Robert Taylor
 Keyboards, vocals – Paul Hewson
 Saxophone, lead vocals  – Billy Rogers
 Synthesizer – Murray Burns
 Violin [Electric Violin]  – Richard Lee

Production
Peter Dawkins – producer
Howard Steele – engineer
Dave Marett – assistant engineer
 Richard Dunn  – cover
 Photography by Graeme Webber – photography
 Greg Penniket – photography

References 

1979 albums
Dragon (band) albums
CBS Records albums
Albums produced by Peter Dawkins (musician)
Rock albums by New Zealand artists